Sapromyza halidayi is a species of small flies of the family Lauxaniidae.

The basic color is reddish-orange. The front femora has dark tips.

References

Lauxaniidae
Muscomorph flies of Europe
Insects described in 2000